Frank DeLuca (April 1, 1898 – May 1967) was an Italian-American mobster who helped control the smuggling and distribution of narcotics in Kansas City, Missouri, for almost four decades.

Born Francesco DeLuca in Giardinello, Sicily, DeLuca migrated to the United States with his brother Joseph DeLuca to Kansas City. Frank DeLuca married Lillian Cora Buckner. Frank was arrested for concealed weapons charges, violating the Alien Registration Act, and murder for hire.

By the 1920s, the two brothers were involved with mobster Joseph DiGiovanni in smuggling and narcotics trafficking in the Midwest. Frank was eventually watched by several federal agencies, including the Bureau of Alcohol, Tobacco, Firearms and Explosives (ATF), the Internal Revenue Service (IRS), the Immigration and Naturalization Service (INS) and the U.S. Department of Justice. He also had some legitimate business.

During the 1950s, at Senate Select Committee hearings on organized crime, known as the Kefauver hearings, Frank and Joe were named as two of the "Five Iron Men" of Kansas City in 1952.

Death
Frank Deluca died in May, 1967.

Further reading
United States. Congress. Senate. Special Committee to Investigate Organized Crime in Interstate Commerce. Investigation of Organized Crime in Interstate Commerce. Washington, D.C.: U.S. Govt. Print. Off., 1951. 
United States. Congress. Senate. Committee on Governmental Affairs. Permanent Subcommittee on Investigations. Profile of Organized Crime: Mid-Atlantic Region. 1984.

External links
The Five Iron Men Of Kansas City by Allan May
The History of the Kansas City Family by Allan May
Las Vegas Review Journal - Mob's LV clout doubtful by Jane Ann Morrison

1898 births
1967 deaths
American gangsters of Sicilian descent
Kansas City crime family
Italian emigrants to the United States